The Guinea Current is a slow warm water current that flows to the east along the Guinea coast of West Africa. It has some similarity to the Equatorial Counter Current in the Indian and Pacific Oceans.

See also 
 Ocean currents
 Oceanic gyres
 Physical oceanography

Currents of the Atlantic Ocean